Klappmaul Theater was a theatre group in Austria, 1975-2005.

Theatres in Austria